The discography of Aygun Kazimova,  Azerbaijani pop, dance, folk dance and jazz singer, consists of 9 studio albums, one remix album, more than thirty singles, and over 70 music videos.

Albums

LP albums
 Eldar Mansurovun mahnıları / Bayatı (1990)

Studio albums

Compilation albums

Live albums

Karaoke albums

EPs

Singles

Music videos

References

External links
 Aygün Kazımova Official website
 Aygün Kazımova Musicbase
 Aygün Kazımova Discogs
 Aygün Kazımova İpluggers
 Aygün Kazımova Deezer
 Aygün Kazımova Spotify

Pop music discographies